Godfrey Isaac Malunga Mzamane (7 March 1909 – 1977) was a novelist, literary historian, academic and intellectual pioneer of African studies in South Africa.

Early life and education 

GGodfrey Mzamane was born in Fobane in the Mt. Fletcher district, near Matatiele in the Transkei. His father Seplani Isaac Mzamane was an Anglican church lay preacher. Godfrey attended primary school at Umzimkhulu, at the French Evangelical Missionary School there; he also attended Bethesda Moravian Mission School at Lupindo. He graduated standard six in 1921.

In 1926, he studied at St John's College, Mthatha, then at Adam's Teacher Training College in Natal. He also went to Fort Hare for a time.

From 1936 to 1939, he taught at the training school in Mariazell, Matatiele. He also taught at St. Peter's Secondary School in Johannesburg. Godfrey then went to Cape Town to learn museum techniques. In 1942, he was appointed the assistant curator of the F.S. Malan Museum at Fort Hare University College.

He replaced A. C. Jordan as Lecturer in Bantu Languages at Fort Hare University College when Jordan resigned his position in the Department of African Languages in 1946. In 1947, he obtained a BA Degree in African languages, followed by a Masters thesis (or "dissertation"), submitted to the University of South Africa (Unisa) in 1948, entitled A concise treatise on Phuthi with special reference to its relationship with Nguni and Sotho, which was published in 1949 and was an important early contribution to the study of Phuthi language. Godfrey was later a Professor and Head of the Department of African Languages at the University College of Fort Hare

Life and writing career 

While teaching at Fort Hare University College he attracted considerable attention with his work on his classic Xhosa novel, Izinto zodidi (things of value) (1959). This didactic novel published in 1959, concerns the failure of the father, Deyi, to cope with modern life as compared to the splendid scientific achievements of his son, Manzodidi, who goes to Canada to study.

In the late 1940s he served as secretary of the Cape African National Congress and was a member of the ANC national executive committee at the time of the Programme of Action.

Notes and references 

 
 
 
 

1909 births
1977 deaths
20th-century South African historians
20th-century South African male writers
20th-century South African novelists
Literary historians
People from the Eastern Cape
South African male novelists
Academic staff of the University of Fort Hare
University of Fort Hare alumni
University of South Africa alumni
Xhosa people